The Ketelbrug is bridge spanning the Ketel-lake between the Noordoostpolder and the Eastern Flevopolder in the Dutch province of Flevoland. The motorway A6 runs over it. 
A part of it is a Bascule bridge.

The  bridge was opened on 15 June 1970.

The Ketelbrug had a lot of accidents. One of those was when the warning lights didn't flash and the bridge went up. Ketelbrug had its warning lights replaced. From Ketelbrug you will be able to see Zwolse-Hoek (Urk), and Kamperhoek.

Bascule bridges
Bridges completed in 1970
Road bridges in the Netherlands
Bridges in Flevoland
Dronten
Noordoostpolder
Zuiderzee Works